Aşağı Apu (also, Ashagy Apu and Nizhneye Apu) is a village in the Lankaran Rayon of Azerbaijan.  The village forms part of the municipality of Daştatük.

References 

Populated places in Lankaran District